Renato Marchiaro (16 February 1919 – 25 December 2017) was an Italian professional football player.

References

External links

1919 births
2017 deaths
Italian footballers
Italian expatriate footballers
Expatriate footballers in France
Expatriate footballers in Portugal
Italian expatriate sportspeople in France
Italian expatriate sportspeople in Portugal
Serie A players
Ligue 2 players
Primeira Liga players
Juventus F.C. players
U.C. Sampdoria players
OGC Nice players
Olympique Alès players
Angers SCO players
C.F. Os Belenenses players
FC Antibes players
Association football forwards
Italian resistance movement members
A.S.D. La Biellese players
People from Bra, Piedmont